Gabriela Lopes Gabriel (born July 23, 1994 in São Paulo) is a Brazilian actress and model. She got famous nationally after her role in the 22nd season of TV series Malhação, at Rede Globo.

Biography 
Gabi has been working as an actress for 15 years. She started in TV at age 8, in 2002, when she hosted the Children's Day Special at SBT alongside famous Brazilian TV hostess Hebe Camargo. Throughout her career she has acted in many TV series: Entre Teens, at MTV, Julie e Os Fantasmas at Rede Band and Nickelodeon, miniseries Queridos Amigos at Rede Globo, Segredos Médicos at Multishow, Na Mira do Crime at FOX, FX and TV Record, Casos de Ocorrência also at Multishow, with Rafinha Bastos, and the award-winning series "Saidera" at Rede Globo, in the role of Carolina. She was cast in the 22nd season of Malhação Sonhos at Rede Globo, as the homosexual fighter Pri.

She started her career in cinema when she was 12 years old, in the role of Maria, the blind protagonist of short film "Por um Sopro de Vida". Soon after came the movies "Os Castelos Não São Eternos", "Eu e Meu Guarda Chuva", and "Casa dos Sonhos Esquecidos". TV series "Na Mira do Crime" was also made into a TV movie, which was shown at FOX, FX and Rede Record. In 2016 she starred in two movies: "Vende-se Ilusões" and "Solteira Quase Surtando". In 2017 it was time for "O Último Virgem", a teenage comedy in which Gabi played the role of the most dashing girl in class. She was also Fabi in "Internet O Filme", a big production of Paris Filmes for which more than 25 TV and web celebrities were cast. In that same year, Gabi got the main part for the first time in a feature film called "VIEW", about a YouTuber who is kidnapped and held hostage. This movie landed her her first international award: First Glance Film Festival Los Angeles, as Best Actress. The film also won in the Best Movie category. Still in 2017, she was seen in "Amor Sem Fronteiras", as Paula, the daughter of Joana (Luana Piovani) and Pedro (Paulo Tiefentaler), a coproduction of Brazil and Argentina which is scheduled to be released in 2018. She got her hair painted brunette for the role of Isis, in movie "Casa de Cléo", a drama in which the character loses her mother.

Career 
In advertisement, Gabi's career started at 8 years old. She was cast in commercials and campaigns for many national brands, such as Speedy Telefônica, O Boticário, Decathlon, Olympikus, Renner, Vivo, Carrefour (with Ana Maria Braga) and Volkswagen. She was also studying theatre during this time. In 2010 she participated in web series and other projects for Forma Turismo. She became a TV hostess for four different programs of Brazilian channel PlayTV, interviewing Kelly Key, Wanessa Camargo and NX Zero in "Combo Fala + Joga". She later joined the Nickelodeon team as a reporter for Patrulha Nick and Nickers. She starred many TV series and music videos, her first being "Cedo ou Tarde" of NX Zero. Nowadays, she has worked in over 35 music videos, of artists such as Anitta, Lucas Lucco, Luan Santana, MC Guime, Nego do Borel, Fernando e Sorocaba, Bruninho e Davi, Munhoz e Mariano, Vintage Culture, among others. For two and a half years she was part of a national project for which she travelled to all Brazilian states, talking about dreams and career building for actors. After Malhação, Gabi got back to theater work, as producer and the main character of a play called "Ladrões de Estrelas", released first in Fortaleza.

Today, she is part of the team of Nosso Canal, a YouTube channel with over 1 million subscribers, apart from her own channel, where she shares her lifestyle and trips around the world. She is an ambassador of brands such as Reebok, Aussie, Samsung, IE Intercambio and Chilli Beans.

In 2016 she founded the video production company Young Republic with movie director Daniel Tupinambá. After just two years in the market, the company has produced over 4 movies and many music videos and ads for brands like Ferrero Rocher, Nutella, Gilette, Aussie, Anhembi Morumbi and others. The production of the YouTube channel is made through the company by the actress herself.

Filmography

Television

Cinema

Theater

Music videos

References

 http://kogut.oglobo.globo.com/noticias-da-tv/noticia/2015/12/ex-malhacao-gabi-lopes-emagrece-12kg-e-fala-das-primeiras-cenas-de-sexo-e-nudez-da-carreira.html
 http://kogut.oglobo.globo.com/noticias-da-tv/noticia/2015/12/ex-malhacao-gabi-lopes-fala-do-sucesso-nas-redes-sociais-e-lembra-namoro-com-brenno-leone-incrivel.html
 https://web.archive.org/web/20160213081140/http://corpoacorpo.uol.com.br/famosas/segredo-das-famosas/gabi-lopes-revela-como-foi-a-preparacao-para-atuar-em-malhacao/5422
 http://www.gabilopes.com.br/profile
 https://web.archive.org/web/20160208055548/http://corpoacorpo.uol.com.br/famosas/segredo-das-famosas/gabi-lopes-conta-quais-sao-seus-segredos-de-beleza/5449
 https://web.archive.org/web/20160213095734/http://atrevida.uol.com.br/conta-tudo/idolos/as-girls-gabi-lopes-e-nah-cardoso-conferiram-de-pertinho-a-premiere-de-jogos-vorazes/10458
 http://www.ofuxico.com.br/noticias-sobre-famosos/gabi-lopes-da-uma-de-reporter-e-se-diverte-em-premiere/2015/11/18-251847.html
 http://entretenimento.r7.com/pop/jovem/fotos/conheca-a-atriz-gabi-lopes-itgirl-que-conquistou-as-redes-sociais-25082014#!/foto/1
 http://entretenimento.r7.com/pop/jovem/fotos/gabi-lopes-muda-visual-para-nova-malhacao-25082014#!/foto/1
 http://www.ofuxico.com.br/noticias-sobre-famosos/gabi-lopes-faz-sua-estreia-nas-tatuagens/2015/08/11-245529.html
 http://www.ofuxico.com.br/noticias-sobre-famosos/gabi-lopes-conhece-idolos-internacionais-em-los-angeles/2015/10/05-248934.html
 http://www.ofuxico.com.br/noticias-sobre-famosos/apos-malhacao-gabi-lopes-leva-peca-para-sao-paulo/2015/08/06-245249.html
 http://revistaquem.globo.com/QUEM-News/noticia/2016/01/gabi-lopes-posa-de-biquini-em-praia-paradisiaca-do-mexico.html
 http://ego.globo.com/viagem/noticia/2015/10/gabi-lopes-tieta-kylie-jenner-em-shopping-nos-estados-unidos.html
 http://revistaquem.globo.com/Popquem/noticia/2015/08/gabi-lopes-comemora-reta-final-de-malhacao-ganhei-um-publico-gls-que-ate-entao-nao-tinha.html
 http://ego.globo.com/ego-teen/noticia/2015/06/gabi-lopes-que-vive-bissexual-pri-de-malhacao-vai-estrear-no-cinema.html
 http://revistaquem.globo.com/QUEM-News/noticia/2015/08/gabi-lopes-grava-clipe-de-rafael-almeida-de-shortinho-e-biquini.html
 http://ego.globo.com/famosos/noticia/2015/09/rafael-almeida-lanca-clipe-ao-lado-de-gabi-lopes-e-jade-seba.html
 http://www.purebreak.com.br/noticias/gabi-lopes-a-pri-de-malhacao-estreia-no-filme-o-ultimo-virgem-com-cenas-ousadas-de-topless/14994
 http://capricho.abril.com.br/famosos/gabi-lopes-lanca-linha-sapatos-rodeada-amigos-famosos-sao-paulo-813787.shtml?ref=lista
 http://capricho.abril.com.br/famosos/mc-guime-lanca-clipe-eu-vim-pra-ficar-assista-817883.shtml?ref=lista
 http://contigo.uol.com.br/noticias/exclusivas/gabi-lopes-de-malhacao-viaja-para-a-africa-do-sul.phtml
 http://caras.uol.com.br/festas/gabi-lopes-celebra-seus-22-anos-com-festa-vip-mc-biel-nego-do-borel-dj-vintage-cultural
 http://caras.uol.com.br/tv/gabi-lopes-carreira-em-hollywood-eu-fico-louco-avo-e-a-mae-november-thirteen
 http://ego.globo.com/moda/noticia/2016/05/gabi-lopes-ex-malhacao-confessa-que-evita-namoro-gosto-da-liberdade.html
 http://ego.globo.com/moda/noticia/2016/07/gabi-lopes-sobre-carreira-nos-eua-meta-e-fazer-filme-com-will-smith.html
 http://ego.globo.com/famosos/noticia/2016/08/gabi-lopes-prestigia-lancamento-de-colecao-em-sao-paulo.html
 http://ego.globo.com/famosos/noticia/2016/08/isabella-santoni-e-gabi-lopes-almocam-juntas-em-sao-paulo.html
 http://ego.globo.com/praia/noticia/2016/07/gabi-lopes-exibe-boa-forma-em-praia-de-fernando-de-noronha.html
 http://ego.globo.com/noite/noticia/2016/07/amanda-de-godoi-e-gabi-lopes-se-empolgam-ao-som-de-mc-biel-e-nego.html
 http://ego.globo.com/famosos/tudo-sobre/Gabi-Lopes.html
 http://ego.globo.com/moda/noticia/2016/07/gabi-lopes-usa-look-inspirado-em-kylie-jenner-para-festao-de-22-anos.html
 http://ego.globo.com/famosos/noticia/2016/07/gabi-lopes-comemora-seus-22-anos-que-me-traga-amor-e-maturidade.html
 http://ego.globo.com/famosos/noticia/2016/07/gabi-lopes-exibe-pernas-em-look-cheio-de-transparencias.html
 http://ego.globo.com/moda/noticia/2016/07/gabi-lopes-ex-malhacao-surge-sexy-e-poderosa-em-ensaio-de-moda.html
 http://blogs.oglobo.globo.com/ancelmo/post/gabi-lopes-da-tv-para-telona.html
 http://gq.globo.com/Musa/noticia/2016/05/gabi-lopes-aparece-inteiramente-nua-embaixo-dagua-em-foto-inedita.html
 http://gq.globo.com/Musa/noticia/2016/07/que-vista-gabi-lopes-aparece-de-biquini-em-foto-na-praia.html
 http://revistaglamour.globo.com/Moda/Fashion-news/noticia/2016/06/gabi-lopes-conheca-atriz-que-saiu-da-malhacao-pra-virar-digital-influencer-bombastica.html
 http://revistamarieclaire.globo.com/Celebridades/noticia/2016/03/ex-malhacao-gabi-lopes-fala-sobre-posar-para-revista-masculina-tenho-muita-vontade.html
 http://vejasp.abril.com.br/blogs/terraco-paulistano/2016/08/gabi-lopes-osasco-los-angeles/

External links

1994 births
Living people
People from São Paulo
Brazilian telenovela actresses
Brazilian film actresses
Brazilian stage actresses
Brazilian female models